Radar guidance or radar-guided may refer to:

 Active radar guidance
 Semi-active radar guidance
 Passive radar guidance
 Radar altimeter guidance